The Vanderhall Venice is a three-wheeled roadster produced by the American vehicle manufacturer Vanderhall Motor Works. Competitive models include the Morgan 3-Wheeler and the Polaris Slingshot.

History 
The two-seater was introduced in 2017. In August 2018 Vanderhall presented the Venice as a single-seater “Speedster” as part of the Sturgis Motorcycle Rally. Initially, the series was only sold in North America, but the manufacturer has been expanding to Europe since 2019.

The model is named after the neighborhood of Venice in Los Angeles.

Legal classification 
As with the Polaris Slingshot, it depends on the registration area of the vehicle whether it is classified as a motorcycle or car.

United States 
The National Highway Traffic Safety Administration classifies the vehicle as a three-wheel motorcycle at the federal level, which is why it does not have to comply with the same crash test standards as a normal car and also does not have to have airbags. In 31 states of the USA there is also the legal term “auto cycle”. Vehicles of this class can be driven there without a motorcycle license. However, Vanderhall Venice is not considered an autocycle in all of these states, as airbags are required for this class, for example in Colorado or New Mexico. Depending on the state, a helmet requirement for autocycles may also apply. For this, the vehicle may drive in states in which it is certified as a motorcycle, for example High-occupancy vehicle lanes.

European Union 
In the EU the vehicle is classified as a three-wheeled motor vehicle in class L5e. In Germany, the Venice can therefore be driven without an additional test for people who obtained a Class 3 or B driver's license before 19 January 2013. As of this day, a motorcycle test (class A) or a test for three-wheel vehicles (class A with the restriction of the code number 79.03) is required.

Specifications 
To reduce costs, the Venice is only available in one trim level and only three colors. This version includes a power steering, a seat heating and a sound system with Bluetooth function. The deceleration takes place by means of ABS and disc brakes on each wheel. With a ground clearance of only 10 cm, a low center of gravity, little weight and wide tires, the Venice achieves a high level of driving dynamics high cornering forces.

References 

Roadsters
Sports cars
Three-wheeled motor vehicles
Cars introduced in 2017
2010s cars
2020s cars
Vanderhall vehicles